Sundown Rider is a 1932 American pre-Code Western film directed by Lambert Hillyer and starring Buck Jones. It was produced and distributed by Columbia Pictures. A print is held by the Library of Congress Packard Campus for Audio-Visual Conservation.

Cast
Buck Jones - Camp O'Neil (as Charles 'Buck' Jones)
Barbara Weeks - Molly McCall
Pat O'Malley - Lafe Armstrong
Niles Welch - Banker Houseman
Ward Bond - Henchman Gabe Powers
Wheeler Oakman - Laughing Maxey
Bradley Page - Jim Hunter
Ed Brady - Sheriff Kenyon
Harry Todd - Mulligan
Frank LaRue - Sheriff Rand (as Frank La Rue)

References

External links

1932 films
Films directed by Lambert Hillyer
Columbia Pictures films
1932 Western (genre) films
American Western (genre) films
American black-and-white films
1930s American films